Kailash Chandra Meena (born 5 July 1965) is a member of the Rajasthan Legislative Assembly from Garhi constituency.

References 

1965 births
People from Banswara district
Rajasthan MLAs 2018–2023
Bharatiya Janata Party politicians from Rajasthan
Living people